This is a list of Hebrew Israelites:

List

References

 
Hebrew Israelites
Black Hebrew Israelites